The Danish ironclad Gorm was a monitor built for the Royal Danish Navy in the 1860s. She was scrapped in 1912.

Description
Her crew consisted of 150 officers and enlisted men.

Gorm had two trunk steam engines, built by John Penn and Sons, each driving one propeller shaft.

She was initially armed with two Armstrong  rifled muzzle-loading (RML) guns mounted in a single turret. In 1875 a pair of  RML guns were added. Four years later a pair of  rifled breech-loading guns were also added and four more 87-millimeter guns were added in 1889. Two years later a pair of quick-firing (QF)  Hotchkiss guns were added. The 254-millimeter guns were ultimately replaced by a pair of QF  guns.

The gun turret was protected by  armor plates.

Construction and career
Gorm was named for Gorm the Old, first historically recognized King of Denmark, was laid down by the Naval Dockyard in Copenhagen on 18 November 1867, launched on 17 May 1870 and completed on 23 June. She was stricken from the Navy List on 12 June 1912 and sold for scrap. The ship was broken up at Stettin, Germany.

Notes

References
 
 
 

Ironclad warships of the Royal Danish Navy
1870 ships
Ships built in Copenhagen